"Love Hurts" is a song by Boudleaux Bryant, first recorded by The Everly Brothers, and covered by Nazareth, Gram Parsons, Cher, and other artists.

Love Hurts may refer to:

Music 
Love Hurts (Cher album), 1991
Love Hurts Tour, a tour for the album above
Love Hurts (Elaine Paige album), 1985
Love Hurts (Jon B. album)
 Love Hurts (Julian Lage album), 2019
"Love Hurts" (Incubus song), 2008
"Love Hurts", by Suzi Quatro from the album Suzi ... and Other Four Letter Words
"Love Hurts", by Tynisha Keli
"Love Hurts", by Playboi Carti featuring Travis Scott from the album Die Lit

Film 
Love Hurts (1991 film), directed by Bud Yorkin
Love Hurts (1993 film), a Dutch film
Love Hurts (2009 film), directed by Barra Grant

Television 
"Love Hurts" (Charmed), an episode in the first season of the TV series Charmed
"Love Hurts" (House), a 2005 episode in the first season of the TV series House
"Love Hurts" (Brooklyn South), an episode of the TV series Brooklyn South
Love Hurts (TV series), a British television series

Literature 
Love Hurts (graphic novel), a Swedish graphic novel by Kim W. Andersson